This page lists the songs that reached number-one on the overall Hot R&B/Hip-Hop Songs chart, the R&B Songs chart (which was created in 2012), and the Hot Rap Songs chart in 2015. The R&B Songs and Rap Songs charts partly serve as distillations of the overall R&B/Hip-Hop Songs chart.

List of number ones

See also
List of Billboard Hot 100 number-one singles of 2015
List of Billboard number-one R&B/hip-hop albums of 2015

References

2015
United States RandB
2015 in American music